Glenn Ruth (born June 13, 1969) is an American professional wrestler, better known by the ring name, Thrasher. For much of his career he has teamed with Mosh, most famously as The Headbangers, a pair of metal-heads known for their outrageous costumes such as nose rings and kilts. Thrasher is best known for his stints in the World Wrestling Federation between 1990 and 2000, where he held the WWF World Tag Team Championship and WWF Hardcore Championship.

Professional wrestling career

Early career (1990–1996) 
Ruth grew up in South Jersey. He trained as a wrestler under Larry Sharpe and debuted in 1990 as The Spider. He later became Sharpe's assistant and helped train wrestlers including Big Show and his future tag team partner Mosh at Sharpe's "Monster Factory" professional wrestling school. Worked in New Jersey, for the National Wrestling Alliance. In 1991, Ruth wrestled as Frankie Favorite for All Japan Pro Wrestling. In Japan he would occasionally teamed up with Johnny Favorite. In 1991 as the Spider, he won the WWA Heavyweight Championship twice in New Jersey from 1991 to 1992 and 1992 to 1993. Also worked in Maryland. On January 23, 1993 the Spider wrestled The Sandman in a Double DQ for Eastern Championship Wrestling. In 1994, he started teaming up with Chaz Warrington as the Spiders working in the independent circuit in New Jersey and Texas. They made a few appearances for Extreme Championship Wrestling in June 1994. In 1995 they moved down to Tennessee for Smoky Mountain Wrestling (SMW). It was there that they changed their gimmicks to the Headbangers. Their slogan was "Real men wear skirts." Ruth became Thrasher and Warrington became Mosh. In December 1995 Smokey Mountain folded and they joined the United States Wrestling Association (USWA).

World Wrestling Federation (1990, 1991–1993, 1995, 1996–2000) 
Ruth debuted in the World Wrestling Federation in August 1990 under his real name losing to Rick Rude. He wrestled several matches for the promotion until leaving in November 1990, making several appearances on WWF Superstars and WWF Wrestling Challenge.

Ruth made a number of appearances for the World Wrestling Federation from 1991 to 1993. Losing to the big names; Ric Flair, Undertaker, Shawn Michaels and Bret Hart. He appeared on the second ever episode of Raw in 1993 a losing effort against Marty Jannetty, competing under his given name as an enhancement talent. Sometimes he even made tag teams appearances against The Smoking Gunns and The Steiner Brothers.

In December 1995, they debuted as jobbers in the WWF as the Spiders, the Royal Spiders, the Arachnoids, and even used their real names. On an episode of Monday Night Raw they got a World Tag Team Title shot against the Smoking Gunns. They returned to the USWA.

Wrestling as "The Spiders", Thrasher and Mosh returned to the WWF on the September 24, 1996 episode of WWF Superstars, losing to The Smoking Gunns. In November 1996, they resumed wrestling as "The Headbangers". At the outset of 1997, The Headbangers briefly began wearing nun outfits and wrestling as "The Flying Nuns" and "The Sisters of Love", with Thrasher wrestling as "Sister Angelica" and Mosh as "Mother Smucker". They were briefly managed by Brother Love.

The Headbangers captured the vacant WWF World Tag Team Championships on September 7, 1997 by defeating three other teams in a four team tag match at Ground Zero. They lost the titles to The Godwinns on October 5 of that same year.

The Headbangers split in January 1999 when Ruth suffered a knee injury and Warrington began pursuing a singles career, but reformed in late 1999 on the October 10 edition of Sunday Night Heat when Ruth came to Warrington's aid during a domestic violence angle, which saw him vilified by other wrestlers and officials alike for a number of weeks. Ruth had presented video footage of Warrington's (kayfabe) girlfriend Marianna Komlos putting on makeup to make it seem as if Warrington had been abusing her. The police officers arresting Warrington then uncuffed him and arrested Komlos for her lies. Shortly thereafter the two began appearing regularly as a team again, but were now heels and inexplicably came to the ring wearing cone brassieres which they wore while they wrestled.

In 2000, Ruth took part in the match for the Hardcore Championship at WrestleMania 2000. He held the title for 37 seconds, pinning Joey Abs and then being pinned by Pete Gas. After the Headbangers split for the second time and Warrington went on to team with D'Lo Brown, Ruth continued to wrestle in singles competition mainly on WWF Jakked before being sent to WWF's Power Pro Wrestling developmental territory in Memphis. He was released from the WWF in December 2000.

Independent circuit (2000–2003) 
After his release from the WWF, Ruth continued to wrestle until 2003 for Maryland Championship Wrestling and independent promotions before retiring from professional wrestling.

Ring of Honor and return to the independent circuit (2011–present) 
In 2011, The Headbangers reformed and have been wrestling on the independent circuit once again. In June 2012, Thrasher and Mosh debuted in Ring of Honor as The Guardians of Truth, a masked tag team managed by Truth Martini. As of 2014, Thrasher now wrestles for independent promotion Championship Wrestling Entertainment in Port St. Lucie, FL. On November 14, 2014, Thrasher defeated Chico Adams to become the CWE Heavyweight Champion.

Return to World Wrestling Entertainment (2016) 
Thrasher and Mosh made an unannounced return to the WWE (formerly WWF) on the 30 August 2016 episode of WWE SmackDown, losing to Heath Slater and Rhyno in the first round of a tournament for the newly-created WWE SmackDown Tag Team Championship. They made two further appearances on SmackDown in November 2016.

Personal life
Ruth is married with four children.

Upon retiring from professional wrestling in 2002, Ruth began working in restaurant management and marketing. Ruth is currently the General Manager of a Papa John's in Boynton Beach, Florida.

Championships and accomplishments
Atomic Revolutionary Wrestling
 ARW Hardcore Championship (1 time)
 ARW Tag Team Championship (1 time, current) – with Thrasher
Blackburn Wrestling Alliance
BWA Tag Team Championship (1 time) – with Greg Spitz
Championship Wrestling Entertainment
CWE Heavyweight Championship (1 time)
Coastal Championship Wrestling
CCW Tag Team Championship (1 time) – with Mosh
Fighting Evolution Wrestling
FEW Tag Team Championship (2 times, current) – with Mosh
Figure Wrestling Federation
FWF Tag Team Championship (1 time) – with Mosh
Heartland Wrestling Association
HWA Tag Team Championship (1 time) – with Mosh
 HLW Tag Team Championship (1 time, current) – with Mosh
Insane Championship Wrestling
ICW Streetfight Tag Team Championship (1 time) – with Mosh
Independent Professional Wrestling Alliance
IPWA Tag Team Championship (1 time) – with Mosh 
Main Event Championship Wrestling
MECW Tag Team Championship (1 time) – with Mosh
Maryland Championship Wrestling
MCW Tag Team Championship (1 time) – with Mosh
Mid-Eastern Wrestling Federation
MEWF Tag Team Championship (1 time) – with Mosh
Memphis Championship Wrestling
MCW Southern Tag Team Championship (1 time) – with Seven
National Wrestling Alliance
NWA World Tag Team Championship (1 time) – with Mosh
National Wrestling League
NWL Tag Team Championship (1 time) – with Mosh
New England Wrestling Federation
NEWF Tag Team Championship (3 times) – with Mosh
Pro Wrestling Illustrated
PWI ranked him # 110 of the Top 500 singles wrestlers in the PWI 500 in 1997.
Texas Wrestling Alliance
TWA Tag Team Championship (1 time) – with Mosh
World Wrestling Association (New Jersey)
WWA Heavyweight Championship (2 times)
WWA Tag Team Championship (1 time) – with Spider #2 
World Wrestling Federation
WWF Hardcore Championship (1 time)
WWF World Tag Team Championship (1 time) – with Mosh
Wrestling For Charity
WFC Tag Team Championship (1 time) – with Mosh

See also 
 The Headbangers

References

External links 
 
 
 

1969 births
20th-century professional wrestlers
21st-century professional wrestlers
American male professional wrestlers
Living people
Professional wrestlers from New Jersey
Sportspeople from Camden, New Jersey
WWF/WWE Hardcore Champions
NWA World Tag Team Champions